The men's 3 metre springboard competition of the diving events at the 2011 Pan American Games will be held on October 27 at the Scotiabank Aquatics Center. The defending Pan American Games champion is Alexandre Despatie of Canada, who will not compete due to an injury. The winner of the competition (if not already qualified) will advance to compete at the 2012 Summer Olympics to be held in London, Great Britain.

The individual diving competitions all consist of two rounds. In the first, the divers each perform five dives. All divers advance to the advance to the finals. In the final round, the divers perform a final set of five dives, with the scores from those dives (and only those dives) used to determine final ranking.

Seven judges evaluate each dive, giving the diver a score between 0 and 10 with increments of 0.5; scores below 7.0 or above 9.5 are rare. The two highest and two lowest scores from each judge are dropped. The remaining three scores are summed, and multiplied by the degree of difficulty of the dive to give the total score for the dive. Scores from each dive in the round are summed to give the round score.

Schedule

Results
Green denotes finalists

References 

Diving at the 2011 Pan American Games

pt:Saltos ornamentais nos Jogos Pan-Americanos de 2011 - Trampolim de 3 m individual feminino